Mark Joseph Coure is an Australian politician. Coure has served as the Minister for Multiculturalism and the Minister for Seniors in the Perrottet ministry since December 2021. He is also a member of the New South Wales Legislative Assembly representing Oatley for the Liberal Party since 2011.

Early years and background
Coure was educated at St Joseph's at Oatley, then Marist College Penshurst and Kogarah. He was a business operator and franchisee owner of Mortgage Choice, a mortgage broking service.

Local government
Coure was elected to Kogarah City Council representing West Ward in 2004, and was re-elected in 2008 with an increased majority. He has served as chair of the council's Development and Assessment Committee, the Assets & Services Committee, and the Governance & Finance Committee.

State politics
In 2011, Coure contested the normally safe Labor seat of Oatley in the St George-Kogarah district. Coure was elected with a swing of 15.9 points, winning the seat with 50.5 per cent of the two-party vote. Coure's opponent was the incumbent Labor sitting member, Kevin Greene who had held the seat for 12 years.

Coure was appointed to the Independent Commission Against Corruption Committee on 22 June 2011. Coure was appointed Deputy Whip of the New South Wales Parliament's Legislative Assembly in 2015. In 2019, he was elected Assistant Speaker of the Legislative Assembly.

In July 2020, The Daily Telegraph reported on Coure's ties to a businessman linked to the United Front Work Department of the Chinese Communist Party.

In December 2021, Coure was appointed as the Minister for Multiculturalism and the Minister for Seniors in the Perrottet government.

Community activity
 Director & Council's representative of Mortdale Community Services 2005 – 2012
 Patron of the Peakhurst Amateur Swimming Club since 2011
 Member of Oatley Public School Council since 2005
 Member of Penshurst West Public School Council since 2011
 Member of Lions Club of St George (formally known as Hurstville St George Lions) since 2003
 Director of the St George and Sutherland Shire Business Enterprise Centre 2006–11
 Director of Oatley RSL & Community Club 2006–09
 Chair of the St George Relay for Life 2004
 Hurstville Grove Neighbourhood Watch 2004–10

References

External links
 

Liberal Party of Australia members of the Parliament of New South Wales
Deputy and Assistant Speakers of the New South Wales Legislative Assembly
Members of the New South Wales Legislative Assembly
Living people
Year of birth missing (living people)
21st-century Australian politicians